This article concerns the period 429 BC – 420 BC.

References